Operation Solomon (Mivtza Shlomo) was a covert Israeli military operation in May 24 to 25, 1991, to airlift Ethiopian Jews to Israel. Non-stop flights of 35 Israeli aircraft, including Israeli Air Force C-130s and El Al Boeing 747s, transported 14,325 Ethiopian Jews to Israel in 36 hours. One of the aircraft, an El Al 747, carried at least 1,088 people, including two babies who were born on the flight, and holds the world record for the most passengers on an aircraft. Eight children were born during the airlift process.

It was the third Aliyah mission from Ethiopia to Israel. Before the mission, there were two similar operations called Operation Moses and Operation Joshua, which were the alternative ways that Ethiopian Jews could leave before they were forced to put an end to these type of programs. In between the time when these operations came to an end and Operation Solomon began, a very small number of Ethiopian Jews were able to leave and go to Israel.

Background
In 1991, the sitting Ethiopian government of Mengistu Haile Mariam was close to being toppled with the military successes of Eritrean and Tigrayan rebels, threatening Ethiopia with dangerous political destabilization.  World Jewish organizations, such as the American Association for Ethiopian Jews (AAEJ), and Israel were concerned about the well-being of the Ethiopian Jews, known as Beta Israel, residing in Ethiopia. The majority of them were living in the Gondar region of the Ethiopian Highlands and were mostly farmers and artisans. Also, the Mengistu regime had made mass emigration difficult for Beta Israel, and the regime's dwindling power presented an opportunity for those wanting to emigrate to Israel. In 1990, the Israeli government and Israeli Defense Forces, aware of Ethiopia's worsening political situation, made covert plans to airlift the Jews to Israel. The United States became involved in the planning of Operation Solomon after it was brought to the US government's attention from American Jewish leaders from the American Association for Ethiopian Jews that the Ethiopian Jews were living in danger.

The US government was also involved in the organization of the airlift. The decision of the Ethiopian government to allow all the Falshas to leave the country at once was largely motivated by a letter from President George H. W. Bush, who had some involvement with Operations Joshua and Moses. Previous to this, Mengistu intended to allow emigration only in exchange for weaponry.

Also involved in the Israeli and Ethiopian governments' attempts to facilitate the operation was a group of American diplomats led by Senator Rudy Boschwitz, including Irvin Hicks, a Deputy Assistant Secretary of State for African Affairs; Robert Frasure, the Director of the African Affairs at the White House National Security Council; and Robert Houdek the Chargé d'Affaires of the United States Embassy in Addis Ababa. Boschwitz had been sent as a special emissary of President Bush, and he and his team met with the government of Ethiopia to aid Israel in the arranging of the airlift. In addition, Assistant Secretary of State for African Affairs Herman Cohen also played an important role, as he was the international mediator of the civil war in Ethiopia. Cohen struck a deal with Mengistu that as long as Ethiopians would have an understanding with the rebels, change their human rights and emigration policy and change their communist economic practice. In response to the efforts of the diplomats, acting President of Ethiopia Tesfaye Gebre Kidan made the ultimate decision to allow the airlift. The negotiations surrounding the operation led to the eventual London roundtable discussions, which established a joint declaration by the Ethiopian combatants who then agreed to organize a conference to select a transitional government. $35 million was raised by the Jewish community to give to the government in Ethiopia so that the Jews could come over to Israel. The money went to the airport expenses in Addis Ababa.

Lead-up: internal debate within the Jewish community
In the decade leading up to the operation, there was a heated division within the Israeli community over whether to accept the Ethiopians. The reasoning against bringing in Ethiopians proved to be very diverse. Some Jews within Israel feared a "shanda fur di goyim" (Yiddish: שאנדע פֿאר די גויים  embarrassment in front of the non-Jews), and thus aimed to avoid the issue of stirring up controversy by ignoring the pleas of the Ethiopian Jews. Others advocated for the operation, but avoided public demonstrations that might lead to arrests and further public controversy. Taking a completely different approach, others within the Israeli community claimed that there was a cultural divide which would make the integration process untenable; these included Director General of the Jewish Agency's Department of Immigration and Absorption Yehuda Dominitz, who likened this displacement to "taking a fish out of water". Still others elaborated on this vague notion with more provocative claims, such as World Zionist Organization writer Malkah Raymist, who argued that the Ethiopians' "mental outlook is that of children... It would take several years before they could be educated towards a minimum of progressive thinking." However, ultimately, these counter arguments were in vain, as the Israeli government went ahead and conducted the airlift anyway, and the jubilant Ethiopians were greeted as they exited the planes by thousands of joyous Israelis.

Operation

The operation was overseen by the Prime Minister at the time, Yitzhak Shamir. It was kept secret by military censorship. Operation Solomon was sped up with substantial help from the AAEJ (American Association for Ethiopian Jews). In 1989, the AAEJ accelerated the process of the Aliyah because Ethiopian-Israeli relations were in the right place. Susan Pollack, who was the director of the AAEJ in Addis Ababa, fought for Operation Solomon to happen sooner rather than later. Israel, who had a gradual plan for this operation, and the US were given a graphic report from Pollack that informed both countries of the terrible conditions that the Ethiopian Jews were living in. The organization went right ahead and got transportation like buses and trucks to have the people of Gondar quickly come to Addis Ababa. To get the Jews in Addis Ababa, many of the Jews that came from Gondar had to venture hundreds of miles by car, horses, and by foot. Some had things taken by thieves on the way, and some were even killed. By December 1989, around 2,000 Ethiopian Jews made their way by foot from their villages in the Gondar highlands to the capital and many more came to join them by 1991.

In order to accommodate as many people as possible, airplanes were stripped of their seats, and due to the low body weight and minimal baggage of the refugees, up to 1,086 passengers were boarded on a single plane.  May 24, 1991 also happened to be a Friday, which begins the Jewish Shabbat, during which transportation is not normally used.  This made more vehicles available for the mission, as Jewish religious law permits breaking the Sabbath traditions for saving lives.

Many of the immigrants came with nothing except their clothes and cooking instruments, and were met by ambulances, with 140 frail passengers receiving medical care on the tarmac. Several pregnant women gave birth on the plane, and they and their babies were rushed to the hospital. Before Operation Solomon took place, many of the Jews there were at a high risk of infection from diseases, especially HIV. The Jews that were left behind had an even higher risk at the infection because the rate of it kept increasing. After a few months, around 20,000 Jews had made their way over. While they were there, they were struggling for basic resources like food and warmth. They thought they would see their families right away.

Upon arrival, the passengers cheered and rejoiced. Twenty-nine-year-old Mukat Abag said, "We didn't bring any of our clothes, we didn't bring any of our things, but we are very glad to be here."

Operation Solomon airlifted almost twice as many Ethiopian Jews to Israel as Operation Moses. Between 1990 and 1999, over 39,000 Ethiopian Jews entered Israel.

World record
The operation set a world record for most passengers on an aircraft when an El Al 747 carried well over 1,000 people to Israel. The record itself is uncontested, but the number of passengers is unclear: Guinness World Records put the number at 1,088, including two babies who were born on the flight. It noted that contemporary reports cite numbers as low as 1,078 and as high as 1,122.

Aftermath: Socio-economic strife
Since being transported to Israel, the vast majority of these Beta Israel transfers have struggled to find work within the region. Estimates in 2006 suggested that up to 80 percent of adult immigrants from Ethiopia are unemployed and forced to live off national welfare payments. Unemployment figures improved significantly by 2016, with only 20 percent of men and 26 percent of women being unemployed. This struggle can be explained by a number of potential factors. Firstly, the transition from the rural, largely illiterate lands of Ethiopia to a highly urban workforce in Israel has proved difficult, especially when considering the fact that most Ethiopian Jews do not speak Hebrew and are in competition with other, more highly skilled immigrant workers. Nevertheless, the fact that the younger generations of Ethiopian Israelis, who have grown up and been educated in Israel and possess graduate degrees and more forms of formal training, still have a disproportionate amount of trouble finding work suggests that other factors may be at play, including potential racial or even religious bias, given that there has been debate over whether or not Ethiopian Jews should be considered Jewish in the first place.

In popular culture
Fig Tree (2018), directed by Alamork Marsha about her own experience with Operation Solomon.

See also
 Operation Joshua
 Operation Moses
 Operation Yachin
 Jewish Agency for Israel

References

Further reading
Naomi Samuel (1999). The Moon is Bread. Gefen Publishing House. 
Shmuel Yilma (1996). From Falasha to Freedom: An Ethiopian Jew's Journey to Jerusalem. Gefen Publishing House. 
Alisa Poskanzer (2000). Ethiopian Exodus. Gefen Publishing House. 
Baruch Meiri (2001). The Dream Behind Bars: The Story of the Prisoners of Zion from Ethiopia. Gefen Publishing House. 
Stephen Spector (2005). Operation Solomon: The Daring Rescue of the Ethiopian Jews. Oxford University Press. ; reviewed by George Jochnowitz in the September/October 2005 issue of Midstream
Ricki Rosen (2006). Transformations: From Ethiopia to Israel. 
Gad Shimron (2007). Mossad Exodus: The Daring Undercover Rescue of the Lost Jewish Tribe. Gefen Publishing House. 
Asher Naim (2003). Saving the Lost Tribe: The Rescue and Redemption of the Ethiopian Jews. Ballantine Publishing Group.

External links
 Jewish Agency for Israel The Jewish Agency has been responsible for the aliyah from around the world since 1948

1991 in Ethiopia
1991 in Israel
1991 in international relations
Aliyah operations
Beta Israel
Ethiopian Jews
Ethiopia–Israel relations
Jewish Agency for Israel
Jews and Judaism in Ethiopia
Solomon
Aerial operations and battles involving Israel
Jewish Ethiopian history
History of the Jews in Africa
Airlifts